Pîl (also rendered as Pill, Pil or Pyll) is a Welsh placename element. The name is defined as the tidal reach of a waterway, suitable as a harbour, and is common along the Bristol Channel and Severn Estuary. The highly localised distribution suggests it may have been part of a common maritime culture on the waterways within the tidal reach of the Severn Sea.

The name is today most commonly associated with the village of Pyle in Glamorgan, and the small village of Pill in Somerset.

Usage
In Welsh toponymy and hydronymy the word is often mistaken for another word "Pŵll" ("Pool"). However, there is no proven link between the words and the two are often found within the same localities (Caerleon has both a Pwll Mawr and a Pîl Mawr either side of the Roman port). It is thought that Pîl developed a secondary meaning of 'refuge', as the name also appears in more inland areas (such as Pilleth in Powys).

Proliferation
Instances of the name are found as far north as Pilling in Lancashire and as far south as South Pill and Pillmere in Saltash, Cornwall. However, the name is most associated with the Severn Sea, from Pembrokeshire in the west to Somerset and Gloucestershire in the east. Robert Macfarlane interpreted the word as denoting "a tidal creek or stream...capable of holding small barges", while Rick Turner noted the word was part of a common lexicon, shared across the Gwent, Somerset and Gloucestershire Levels.

History

The prevalence of this element indicates its significance in the development of medieval communities along the Severn. This is perhaps most evident on the River Usk, where Pîls were located both at the old Roman port of Caerleon and at the new Norman castle further south.
The city of Newport would develop around a number of Pîls, such as those at Pillgwenlly (said to have been the base of piracy by Gwynllyw, the future patron saint of Newport and its Cathedral) and Arthur's Pîl (or Town Pîl), the site of the 2002 archaeological discovery of the Newport ship (now the Riverfront Arts Centre).

List of place names with the element

Bristol
Broad Pill, Shirehampton
Elbury Pill, Avonmouth (No longer extant)
Morgans Pill
New Pill
Stup Pill Rhine
Wimpenny Pill

Carmarthenshire
Main Pill
Railsgate Pill
Pil Dafen, a tidal stream in the National Wetlands Centre at Llanelli

Ceredigion
Pil Lodge

Cornwall
Bodmin Pill, River Fowey
Caffamill Pill, River Fowey
Cliff Pill, River Fowey
 Frenchman's Pill, Helford River
Manely Pill, River Lerryn
Mendy Pill, River Lerryn
 Mixtow Pill, River Fowey
Pill Cove, Helford Passage
 Pill Creek, River Fal
Pill Farm, Lostwithiel, River Fowey
 Pont Pill, River Fowey
 South Pill, Saltash
 Terras Pill Bridge, also known as Terras Bridge, Sandplace.
Wooda Pill, River Lerryn
Woodgate Pill, River Fowey

Devon
Pilton

Glamorgan
Blackpill, Swansea
Burry Pill
Cogan Pill, Penarth (no longer extant)
Court Sart Pill, Neath
Giant's Grave Pill, Neath
Great Pill
Jones' Pill, a Pil "on the shore of Portmanmoor", East Moors, Cardiff (no longer extant).
Melincryddan Pill, Neath
Pil-du-Reen, a waterway in Trowbridge, Cardiff
Pilgot-Fawr, on the river Ely, in the Penarth Road area of Grangetown (near the point where Stadium Close meets Penarth Road today, no longer extant).
Pil y Cynffig
Pill, the name of a farm in Rumney, near the Severn shore.
Pen y Pil, a school and area above the Pil-du-Reen
Pennard Pill, a watercourse at Three Cliffs Bay
Pwll-Mawr, an area of Rumney, Cardiff. It is first recorded as "the Great Pill" In a charter of 1218, and is named for a Pill at the mouth of the Rhymney estuary.
Pyle
Red Jacket Pill, now a Lake on the Neath and Tennant Canal

Gloucestershire
Berkeley Pill
Brims Pill, Newnham
Bullo Pill, Newnham
Cake Pill
Chestle Pill
Conigre Pill
Hill Pill
Pilning
The Pill, a Waterway running through the village of Pilning and the Pilning Wetlands
Waldings Pill

Gwent
Arthur's Pill or Town Pill, Newport (no longer extant)
Caldicot Pill (south of a road named The Pill, Portskewett)
Chapel Pill
Collister Pill Reen
Crindau Pill
Goldcliff Pill
Julians Pill, the inlet at the Newport Uskmouth Sailing Club
Liswerry Pill Reen
Maes-glas Pill
Magor Pill (also a street and farm between Magor Pill and the town of Magor)
Mathern Pill
Mireland Pill Reen
Pillgwenlly, Newport (The Pil itself is no longer extant).
Pillmawr, West of Caerleon, also the name of a village.
Pillbach, between Pillmawr and the port at Caerleon, on the northern bank of the Usk.
Park Pill, west of Pillmawr.
Peterstone Pill
St. Pierre Pill
Small Pill, Peterstone Wentlooge
Spytty Pill, Newport
Towyn Pill Reen
Tynypil, Peterstone Wentlooge
Undy Pill
West Pill Reen

Pembrokeshire
Castle Pill, near Milford Haven, which gives its name to Pill Road.
Cosheston Pill, Pembroke Dock
Edward's Pill
Ford Pill
Garon Pill, Lawrenny
Goldborough Pill
Hubberston Pill, the waterway separating Milford Haven and Hakin, from which Pill Priory is named.
Jacob's Pill
Kingswood Pill
Layers Pill
Llangwm Ferry Pill
Llangwm Pill,
Millin Pill
Minwear Pill (opposite Slebech Hall on the Eastern Cleddau)
Monkton Pill, Pembroke
Pennar Mouth Pill, Pembroke
Pill Fort
Pill Priory
Pill Susan
Quoits Water Pill, Pembroke
Radford Pill
Sprinkle Pill
Westfield Pill, Neyland.
West Llanion Pill, Pembroke Dock

Somerset
Chapel Pill (no longer extant)
Combwich Pill
Huntspill
Huntspill River
Kilve Pill
Kingston Pill
Pill, Somerset
Pill Bridge, Ilchester
Pill Copse, a wood in Blue Anchor named for the Pill River
Pill River, Chapel Cleeve
Pilton, Somerset
Pims Pill Reach
Portishead Pill (no longer extant)
Pylle
Stroud Pill
Uphill

See also
Celtic onomastics
Celtic toponymy
List of generic forms in place names in the United Kingdom and Ireland
Toponymy in Great Britain
Welsh place names in other countries
Welsh toponymy

References

Place name element etymologies
Welsh toponymy
Welsh words and phrases